Laxus is a genus of nematode worms from the subfamily Stilbonematinae of the family Desmodoridae. Like other members of this subfamily, they are covered by a layer of symbiotic sulfur-oxidizing bacteria, which in Laxus are coccoid in shape. They are distinguished from other stilbonematine genera by the finely-annulated somatic cuticle, thickened cephalic cuticle, small and coiled amphidial fovea, and lack of male structures. There are at least five species in the genus.

References 

Chromadorea genera
Chemosynthetic symbiosis